El Número Uno ("The Number One") is a Spanish reality television music competition which started in March 2012, and was renewed for a second season which aired in 2013. In this show, a group of five judges evaluate 100 contestants to find "The Number One" of music in Spain.

Jury
 Ana Torroja
 David Bustamante
 Miguel Bosé
 Mónica Naranjo
 Natalia Jiménez
 Sergio Dalma

Weeks

Week 1
Miguel Bosé's group

Natalia Jiménez's group

Sergio Dalma's group

Ana Torroja's group

David Bustamante's group

Week 2

Celebrity guest: Jason Mraz, El sueño de Morfeo

Weeks

Eliminations 

(*)

References

Talent shows
Spanish reality television series
2012 Spanish television series debuts